Candle is an unincorporated community in the Northwest Arctic Borough of the U.S. state of Alaska. It is situated on the west bank of the Kiwalik River at Candle Creek. It was founded around 1901 as a mining camp, named for the adjacent creek. The post office was established in 1902.

History
Candle is the birthplace of prominent Native American actor Ray Mala. Although there was a hospital in Candle, Mala was delivered in an Inupiaq sod house by his grandmother and a niece on a ruthlessly cold morning two days after Christmas in 1906.

In 1908, Candle was the turnaround point for the first major mushing competition, the All Alaska Sweepstakes, which was started by John Skyles Beltz and Allan "Scotty" Alexander Allan, and ran  from Nome to Candle and back.

Demographics

Candle first appeared on the U.S. Census as an unincorporated village in 1910. It continued to report until 1960. Although it has not been completely abandoned, it has not reported a separate population since 1960.

References

Mining communities in Alaska
Unincorporated communities in Alaska
Unincorporated communities in Northwest Arctic Borough, Alaska